Eurypelta is a genus of leaf beetles in the subfamily Eumolpinae. It is known from India.

The genus was originally named Euraspis by Félicien Chapuis in 1874. However, the name was determined to be a spelling error of Euryaspis, which was preoccupied by the beetle genus Euryaspis Blanchard, 1851, so Chapuis's genus was renamed to Eurypelta by Édouard Lefèvre in 1885.

Species
 Eurypelta modesta (Fabricius, 1792)
 Eurypelta splendida Medvedev, 2018

References

Eumolpinae
Chrysomelidae genera
Beetles of Asia
Insects of India
Taxa named by Édouard Lefèvre